Garvi Gujarat Bhawan is the Official Guest house of Government of Gujarat in Delhi. It has been built over 7,066 square meter plot on Akbar Road, New Delhi. It is also the first state bhawan in capital to be certified as a Green building.

The Building 
New Gujarat Bhavan has been built using Dhaulpur and Agra stones. The old Gujarat Bhavan is located on Kautilya Marg over a 1418 square meter plot. The structure is spread over an area of 7,066 square metres  and The total cost of this complex is Rs. 131 crore. Gujarat Bhavan has about 78 differently themed guest rooms, distributed in seven storeys, which comprise 2 Presidential suites, 17 VIP suites, and 59 guest rooms.

This new Garvi Gujarat Bhavan is having following facility.

 19 Suit Rooms
 59 Rooms
 Restaurant
 Public Dining Hall
 Business Centre
 Souvenir Shop
 Multi-purpose hall
 Conference Hall
 Four Lounges
 Gymnasium
 Yoga Centre
 Terrace Garden
 Library.

References 

State governments' houses in Delhi
Government of Gujarat
Official residences in India